Ars Combinatoria (combinatorial art) may refer to:

 A logical method described by Gottfried Leibniz in his De Arte Combinatoria and attributed to Ramon Llull
 Ars Combinatoria (journal), a Canadian mathematical journal
 Ars Combinatoria (1980) by Francisco Guerrero (composer)
 Ars Combinatoria for Small Orchestra (1981) by composer Milton Babbitt
 Musikalisches Würfelspiel, a system for using dice to 'generate' music from precomposed options